The University College of the Cayman Islands (UCCI) is a tertiary educational institution in the Cayman Islands.

History

The original Community College was established as a part-time institution in 1975, and was the first government-sponsored tertiary education in the Cayman Islands.

The Trade School, the Hotel School and the Marine School were founded between 1976 and 1981.

In 1985 all of these institutions were amalgamated as the community College of the Cayman Islands.

In 2004 the Legislate Assembly passed an Act changing the name to the University College of the Cayman Islands.

Courses

The college offers certificate programmes in Accounting, Computer Technician, Electrical Technology, Computer Applications, Construction Technology and Hospitality Studies.
UCCI works with the Cayman Islands Society of Professional Accountants (CISPA) in defining the college's accounting programme, and as of September 2007 to offer Certified Public Accountant (CPA), Certified General Accountant (CGA) and Association of Chartered Certified Accountants (ACCA) review classes.
Reviewing the first year of UCCI's Certified Accounting Technician programme, CISPA considered that it had been successful, although some changes could be made to better prepare students for their first work experience.

The University College offers Associate of Arts, Associate of Sciences and Associate of Applied Sciences courses, followed by degree programmes leading to BSc degrees in Business Administration, Computer Science, Natural Science and Social Science, and Bachelor of Education degrees. UCCI also offers Commonwealth Executive MBA and Master of Public Administration degrees, as well as various professional and executive educational programmes.

References

Colleges in the Cayman Islands
Community colleges
Educational institutions established in 1975
Universities in the Cayman Islands
Buildings and structures in George Town, Cayman Islands
1975 establishments in the Cayman Islands